Bob Brown led the Australian Greens from 2005 until 2012. During this period, a select number of members of the parliamentary party served as official spokespersons for the party both inside and outside of Parliament on various issues, each member being assigned portfolios for their speaking duties. This allows the Greens to shadow government policies and actions from the party perspective.

Final arrangement

References

External links
 Portfolios of the Greens caucus

Brown
2005 establishments in Australia
2012 disestablishments in Australia